Mi Tierra (My Homeland) is the third studio album by Cuban-American recording artist Gloria Estefan, released on June 22, 1993, by Epic Records. Produced by husband Emilio Estefan, it is a Spanish-language album and pays homage to her Cuban roots. The album features Cuban musical genres, including boleros, danzón and son music. Recorded at Crescent Moon Studios in Miami, Florida, Mi Tierra features notable Latin musicians such as Tito Puente, Arturo Sandoval, Cachao López, Chamin Correa and Paquito D'Rivera.

The album was an international success, selling over five million copies worldwide. In the United States it was the first record to reach number one on the Billboard Top Latin Albums chart, spending 58 weeks at #1 (longest running #1 album on the chart ever). It also peaked at number twenty-seven on the Billboard 200 chart. Mi Tierra has sold over one million copies in the US and Spain. The album received favorable reviews from critics, who praised the album's production, songs and Estefan's vocals. Its success won the singer a Grammy Award for Best Tropical Latin Album. Mi Tierra spawned seven singles: "Mi Tierra", "Con Los Años Que Me Quedan", "Tradición", "Montuno", "¡Sí Señor!...", "Mi Buen Amor" and "Ayer".

Background
Gloria Estefan had wanted to record a Spanish-language album reflecting her Cuban heritage since the beginning of her musical career. Before recording in English, Estefan and her band performed at Latin nightclubs;
she also remembered her grandmother teaching her old Cuban songs. Music had an important role in Estefan's family; her paternal grandmother was a poet, and an uncle played the flute in a salsa band. The singer's desire to record an album in Spanish was also influenced by her son, Nayib; she wanted him to recognize his Cuban heritage.

Recording and production
Mi Tierra was produced by Estefan's husband, Emilio Estefan, and fellow Miami Sound Machine members Clay Ostwald and Jorge Casas. It features notable Latin musicians, including Nestor Torres, Cachao López, Paquito Hechavarría, Chamin Correa, Paquito D'Rivera, Arturo Sandoval, Luis Enrique and Tito Puente. Additional performers include Sheila E. and the London Symphony Orchestra. The album was recorded at Crescent Moon Studios in Miami, Florida. Celia Cruz was invited to perform, but was unable to do so because of her touring schedule. The album's cover features Estefan in a black-and-white photo at a Havana nightclub before the Cuban Revolution.

Musical style and songs 

The opening track on the album, "Con los Años Que Me Quedan" ("With the Years I Have Left"), is a Cuban bolero song. Three other bolero tracks on Mi Tierra are "Mi Buen Amor" ("My True Love"), "Volverás" ("You'll Be Back"), and "Hablas de Mí" ("You're Talking About Me"). The title track details the passion of Estefan's homeland in a salsa arrangement. In "Ayer" ("Yesterday") the singer finds a flower given to her by a lover and yearns for him to return, since life is short. Its music combines bolero and son music. "No Hay Mal Que Por Bien No Venga" ("Out of All Bad, Some Good Things Come") is a danzón recalling a brief love affair.

"¡Sí Señor" ("Yes Sir!") is another son track featured on the album. The bolero "Volverás" was later covered by Mexican recording artist Alejandro Fernández on his album Me Estoy Enamorando (1997), also produced by Emilio Estefan. "Montuno" takes its name from the musical genre of the same name. "Hablemos El Mismo Idioma" ("Let's Speak The Same Language") is an anthem, reaching out to other Spanish-speaking groups, telling them that since they speak the same language they should leave their differences behind. The album closes with "Tradición" ("Traditional"), which is performed as a guaguancó.

Critical reception

Jose F. Promis of AllMusic awarded the album four stars out of five, calling it "one of [Estefan's] most satisfying." Mi Tierra was "a breezy, sunny album with moments of melancholy," and "one of her most consistent albums to date." Achy Obejas of the Chicago Tribune gave the album four out of four stars, praised it as "dispensing with the brash sound of more contemporary salsa" and lauded Emilio Estefan for the album's production. Anne Hurley of Entertainment Weekly said that Mi Tierra "will whirl you through an intoxicating landscape of traditional Cuban rhythms and aromatic flavors," and applauded the guest musicians on the album.

Parry Gettelman of the Orlando Sentinel gave Mi Tierra four out of five stars, commending the album as "uncompromising, offering up songs and arrangements firmly rooted in Cuban traditions." He compared it to Estefan's earlier recordings with the Miami Sound Machine, including her musical style and songwriting: "She ditches the synths and employs the London Symphony Orchestra's strings to graceful effect...abandoning melodrama for real color and emotional shading." John Lannert described Mi Tierra for the Sun-Sentinel as "Estefan's Latin 'unplugged' album" and her "most satisfying effort to date."

Accolades
At the 36th Grammy Awards, Mi Tierra was the Best Tropical Latin Album. At the 6th Lo Nuestro Awards Estefan received two awards in the tropical category, for Female Artist of the Year and Album of the Year. The singer was Female Artist of the Year at the first Billboard Latin Music Awards, and Mi Tierra was Album of the Year in the tropical-salsa category. At the 1994 Spanish Ondas Awards, Mi Tierra was the Best International Album and Estefan the Best International Artist. It was recognized as the best-selling Latin album of the year with a 1993–94 NARM Best Seller Award. In 2015, Billboard listed Mi Tierra as one of the Essential Latin Albums of Past 50 Year stating that "Through son, she transports us to a magical place in the '50s where time stood still on her beloved island".

Commercial performance

Album
In the United States, Mi Tierra peaked at number twenty-seven on the Billboard 200 chart. It was the first number-one album on the Billboard Top Latin Albums chart, established when it was released. The album spent a total of fifty-eight weeks atop the chart, until it was displaced by Selena's album Amor Prohibido the week of June 11, 1994. It was more successful on the Billboard Tropical Albums chart, where it spent ninety-one weeks on top. Mi Tierra debuted at number one on the Billboard Latin Pop Albums chart the week of July 10, 1993, but it was removed from the chart following week since it did not meet its criteria.

Mi Tierra ended 1994 as the best-selling Latin album of the year in the United States. According to Billboard, most purchasers did not speak Spanish. In Latin America, the album was certified double platinum in Argentina and triple platinum in Mexico. It sold over 30,000 copies in Chile.

In Europe, Mi Tierra peaked at number fifty-nine in Germany, number nine in the Netherlands, number one in Spain, number twenty-five in Switzerland and number eleven in the United Kingdom. The album was certified 10× platinum in Spain (for shipping one million copies) and certified gold in Switzerland. It also sold 200,000 in England. Mi Tierra was the 60th-best-selling album of the 1990s, and sold over five million copies worldwide (four million outside the U.S.).

Singles
"Mi Tierra" was the first single released from the album. In the United States, it reached number one on the Billboard Hot Latin Songs chart and number five on the Billboard Hot Dance Club Songs chart. In Europe, the song peaked at number seventy-seven on the Media Control charts in Germany, twenty-seventh on the Mega Single Top 100 chart in Netherlands and thirty-sixth on the UK Singles Chart. The second single, "Con Los Años Que Me Quedan", also reached number one on the Hot Latin Songs chart in the United States. An English version, "If We Were Lovers", was released as a single and peaked at number forty on the UK Singles Chart. The third single, "Tradición", reached number one the Hot Dance Clubs chart in the United States.

"Montuno" was the fourth single released from the album, peaking at number fifty-five on the UK Singles chart. The fifth single, "¡Sí Señor!..." peaked at number forty-four on the Mega Single Top 100 chart in the Netherlands. The sixth, "Mi Buen Amor", reached number one on the Hot Latin Songs chart in the United States. The last single released from the album was "Ayer", which peaked at number five on the Hot Latin Songs chart.

Track listing 
Official translations provided by Allmusic and by Gloria Estefan on the Mi Tierra liner notes.

Personnel 
Credits adapted from Allmusic and the Mi Tierra liner notes.

Performers
Randy Barlow – arranger, trumpet, background vocals
Rafael "Felo" Barrio – timbales
Cachao – arranger, bajo sexto, bass guitar
Jorge Casas – arranger, bajo sexto, bass guitar, background vocals, twelve-string guitar, producer, très
Alejandro Correa, Alfredo Correa – background vocals
Chamin Correa – guitar, requinto, background vocals
Paquito D'Rivera – saxophone
Luis Enrique – bass guitar, percussion, timbales
Emilio Estefan Jr. –  arranger, producer
Gloria Estefan – arranger, background vocals, lead vocals
Estéfano – arranger
Nelson González – bass guitar, percussion, très
Paquito Hechavarría – piano
Sebastian Krys 
London Symphony Orchestra – strings
Juanito Márquez – guitar
Teddy Mulet – arranger, trombone, trumpet, background vocals
Alfredo Oliva – viola
Jorge Orbon, Robert Basso, Max Teppich, Alexander Prilutchi – violin
Clay Ostwald – arranger, piano, producer, timbales
Rafael Padilla – bass, percussion
Tito Puente – congas, timbales
Cheíto Quinonez  – trumpet, background vocals
Serena Radaelli – estilista
Roberto Luis Rodriguez, Arturo Sandoval – trumpet
Jon Secada – background vocals
Sheila E. – congas, timbales
Jorge Sicre  – cello
Debbie Spring – charango, cuerda, viola, violin
Néstor Torres – flute

Technical
Mike Couzzi – mixing
Nancy Donald – art direction
Charles Dye – engineer
Pablo Flores – mixing
Geoff Foster – assistant
Noel Harris – assistant
Mark Krieg – assistant
Patrice Wilkinson Levinsohn – engineer
Bob Ludwig – mastering
Frank Miret – engineer
Lance Phillips – assistant
Phil Ramone – mixing
Andrew Roshberg – assistant
Eric Schilling – engineer, mixing
Ron Taylor – engineer
Alberto Tolot – photography
Francesca Tolot – make-Up
Christine Wilson – design
Javier Vacas – assistant

Charts

Weekly charts

Year-end charts

Certifications and sales

See also 

 1993 in Latin music
 List of best-selling albums in Mexico
 List of best-selling albums in Spain
 List of best-selling Latin albums
 List of best-selling Latin albums in the United States
 List of number-one Billboard Latin Pop Albums from the 1990s
 List of number-one Billboard Top Latin Albums from the 1990s
 List of number-one Billboard Tropical Albums from the 1990s
 List of number-one albums of 1993 (Spain)
List of number-one albums of 1994 (Spain)
 Music of Cuba

Notes

References 

1993 albums
Albums produced by Emilio Estefan
Epic Records albums
Gloria Estefan albums
Grammy Award for Best Tropical Latin Album
Spanish-language albums